Sumner is a neighborhood in the Northeast section of Portland, Oregon, including the portion of the city of Maywood Park west of Interstate 205. The area includes Portland International Airport at its northern extreme but there are no residences surrounding it.  Also the area north of Columbia Blvd. is industrial and commercial, though it does contain a few hotels.

References

External links 

 Sumner Street Tree Inventory Report

Neighborhoods in Portland, Oregon